Bruce McDonald may refer to:

 Bruce McDonald (Australian politician) (born 1935), New South Wales politician
 Bruce McDonald (director) (born 1959), Canadian film and TV director
 Bruce McDonald (judge) (died 2005), Canadian judge
 Bruce Alexander McDonald (1925–1993), officer in the Australian Army
 Bruce J. McDonald (Michigan politician) (1866–1923), Michigan politician

See also
 Bruce MacDonald (disambiguation)